River Cocker may refer to:

 River Cocker, Cumbria, a river in the English county of Cumbria
 River Cocker, Lancashire, a river in the English county of Lancashire